Robert Bradshaw may refer to:

 Robert Llewellyn Bradshaw (1916–1978), former Premier and Chief Minister of Saint Kitts and Nevis, labor activist
 Robert Bradshaw (figure skater) (1954–1996), American figure skater
 Robert Haldane Bradshaw (1759–1835), agent to Francis Egerton, 3rd Duke of Bridgewater
 Robert C. Bradshaw, Union Army general during the American Civil War

See also 
 Robert L. Bradshaw International Airport, Saint Kitts